The 1979–80 Canada men's national ice hockey team represented Canada at the 1980 Winter Olympics held in Lake Placid in the United States.

This was the first men's ice hockey team to compete for Canada at the Olympics since the 1968 Winter Olympics held at Grenoble, France.

Canada's team placed sixth in the tournament to finish out of the medals.

History
Canada returned to ice hockey at the 1980 Winter Olympics after missing both the 1972 and 1976 Winter Olympics due to a dispute with the IIHF over the use of professional athletes at world championships.

1980 Winter Olympics roster
Head coaches: Lorne Davis, Clare Drake, Tom Watt
Glenn Anderson
Warren Anderson
Dan D'Alvise
Ken Berry
Ron Davidson
John Devaney
Bob Dupuis
Joe Grant
Randy Gregg (C)
Dave Hindmarch
Paul MacLean
Kevin Maxwell
James Nill
Terry O'Malley
Paul Pageau
Brad Pirie
Kevin Primeau
Don Spring
Tim Watters
Stelio Zupancich

See also
 Canada men's national ice hockey team
 Ice hockey at the 1980 Winter Olympics
 Ice hockey at the Olympic Games
 List of Canadian national ice hockey team rosters

References

 
Canada men's national ice hockey team seasons